Kim Ga-young (Hangul: 김가영); born December 2, 1991) is a South Korean actress and singer. She is best known as a former member of the South Korean girl-group Stellar between 2011 and 2017. She is currently also the manager of her own cafe called "Hartogela" in Itaewon, South Korea.

Early life 
Gayoung was born and grew up in Seoul. From primary-school to high-school she learned traditional Korean dance and participated in contests, in which she won awards, including:
 16th Sungkyunkwan University National Primary, Middle, Highschool Dance Competition Special Awards
 The 40th Dance Association of Korea, Korean Traditional Dance Runner-up

She entered Sungkyunkwan University to major in dance, and studied during her activities as an idol in Stellar.

Career

2010-2011: "Gugak high-school girl" and idol pre-debut
Gayoung initially gained fame as the "Gugak high-school girl" when she appeared on a 2 Days & 1 Night special as a viewer. She was later scouted by the agency, Top Class Entertainment (which was later renamed The Entertainment Pascal). She entered the agency with the intention of being an actress, and she debuted as such in Spy Myung-wol, however her agency wanted her to sing and dance as well and she was soon debuted as an idol as part of the girl-group Stellar.

2011-2017: Stellar 
Stellar initially debuted with a quirky and cute concept, but as the agency was struggling financially due to multiple unsuccessful album releases, the girl-group later turned to a more provocative concept which received a lot of controversy and backlash, but also made Stellar become more well-known.

2017-present: Continued acting and interview about the sexy contract & reveal difficulties as an idol
In August 2017 she did not renew her contract with her then agency, The Entertainment Pascal, and started pursuing roles in acting for herself. In 2018 she revealed that she has opened a cafe called "Hartogela" in Itaewon and is running it while continuing to pursue her dream of being an actress.

In an interview with Insight on December 17, 2018, she revealed her history and the difficulties that she and her members faced from performing the sexy concept, from both the perception of the public, as well as the pressure that their company placed on members to follow their direction. When asked if she would be an idol again, she responded that "I don't think I would do it again". She concluded the interview with advice to new aspiring idols, that while it is important to work hard, the direction in which you are pursuing is important too.

Discography

Singles

Filmography

Dramas

Movies

Television shows

Awards and nominations

Education 
 Gugak National High School Traditional Korean Dance Major
 Sungkyunkwan University Dance Major

External links 
 Gayoung Kim (Official Homepage)
 Radio in Gayoung - Official V-live

References 

1991 births
Living people
21st-century South Korean actresses
South Korean film actresses
South Korean television actresses
South Korean web series actresses
Stellar members
South Korean female idols
South Korean women pop singers
21st-century South Korean singers
21st-century South Korean women singers
Sungkyunkwan University alumni